Raphael Nuzzolo (born 5 July 1983) is a Swiss professional footballer who currently plays as a midfielder for Neuchâtel Xamax.

Career
Born in Biel, Nuzzolo began playing football for hometown club Biel-Bienne. After two seasons there he joined Neuchâtel Xamax in 2001. Originally hired as a forward, he only started to be successful years later when he was moved to the position of right midfielder.

In 2006, Miroslav Blazevic who was then trainer at Neuchâtel Xamax, declared that "Nuzzolo has a future in the Swiss national team". On Sunday 19 February 2006 he scored his first goal at the highest Swiss level on a 2–2 tie in Zurich against Grasshoppers.

During the 2008–09 season, as Xamax's trainer by then Nestor Clausen had difficulties finding a performant right back, he moved Nuzzolo to this position, which he kept for most of the season.

In the 2009–10 season, Nuzzolo proved being a key player of the team as either a left or right midfielder and has been regarded by many as the club's best player for that season. For the 2010–11 season he was elected captain of the first team, reinforcing his position as a both a key a local figure at the start of his 10th season for the club.

On 16 July 2011, he was transferred to Young Boys for an undisclosed fee.

Personal life
Nuzzolo was born in Switzerland and is of Italian descent.

References

External links

1983 births
Living people
People from Biel/Bienne
Association football midfielders
Swiss men's footballers
Swiss people of Italian descent
Swiss Super League players
Swiss Challenge League players
Neuchâtel Xamax FCS players
BSC Young Boys players
FC Biel-Bienne players
Sportspeople from the canton of Bern